Shimpi is an umbrella term for the Indian caste traditionally involved in the business of clothing and tailoring. Saint Namdev of the Bhakti movement is revered as the patron of the community.

Occupation
The traditional occupation of the community is tailoring or cloth printing. They are referred to as "Shimpi" in Marathi or "Chimpi" in Hindi.

Government classification
The Shimpi are included in the central list of Other Backward Classes (OBC) by the government of Maharashtra.

Varna
As per Christian Lee Novetzke, the other communities consider them to be of the Shudra varna in the Hindu caste system; however, followers of Namdev who belong to the Shimpi community commonly claim to be of Kshatriya origin.

Notables
Namdev - revered 14th-century saint of the Bhakti movement and Varkari sect
Chandrakant Mandare - Marathi actor
Shashikala - Indian actress
Wamanrao Mahadik - First Shiv Sena legislator in the Maharashtra Legislative Assembly

References

Social groups of Maharashtra